Pogodin is a Russian surname that has been borne by, among others:

 Arkady Pogodin (1901—1975), Soviet singer
 Mikhail Pogodin (1800-1875), historian and journalist
 Nikolai Pogodin (1900-1962), pseudonym of N. F. Stukalov, playwright
 Oleg Pogodin (b. 1965), film director and scriptwriter
 Serhiy Pohodin (b. 1968), Ukrainian footballer and coach